Lone Scouts are members of the Scout movement who are in isolated areas or otherwise do not participate in a regular Scouting unit or organization.  A Lone Scout must meet the membership requirements of the Scouting organization to which they belong and have an adult Scout leader or counselor who may be a parent, guardian, minister, teacher, or another adult. The leader or counselor instructs the boy and reviews all steps of Scouting advancement. Lone Scouts can be in the Scout Section or sections for older young people, and in some countries in the Cub section or sections for younger boys. They follow the same program as other Scouts and may advance in the same way as all other Scouts.

Lone Scouts exist in many countries in the world, including Australia, the United Kingdom, Canada and the United States.

History
John Hargrave was the inspirator of the Lone Scouts. Hargrave wrote a series of articles for "Lone Scouts", held Lonecraft Camps and wrote Lonecraft, the handbook for Lone Scouts, published in 1913. Hargrave's book referred to individual Lone Scouts and Lone Patrols. Hargrave dedicated his book to naturalist Ernest Thompson Seton, founder of the Woodcraft League. Hargrave was an early Boy Scout and, in 1917, became Commissioner for Woodcraft and Camping in the Baden-Powell Boy Scouts but Baden-Powell and his organization refused to recognize Hargrave's Lone Scouts and Woodcraft Scouting. Hargrave, a Quaker pacifist and medical corps war veteran of the disastrous 1915 Gallipoli Campaign, became increasingly disenchanted with the military dominated leadership and militarism of the Baden-Powell Boy Scouts and in February, 1919, he held a meeting of like-minded Scout leaders. In 1920 Hargrave formed the Kindred of the Kibbo Kift and in January 1921 he was expelled from Baden-Powell's organization. Many Lone Scouts disassociated from the Baden-Powell organization, some joined Hargrave's Kibbo Kift while others joined the British Boy Scouts, other National Peace Scouts or remained independent Scouts and patrols.

The term "Lone Scout" was later officially adopted by Baden-Powell's Boy Scouts Association.

The Lone Scouts of America were formed in 1915 by William D. Boyce, a Chicago newspaper entrepreneur.  This organization merged with the Boy Scouts of America in 1924; its mission has been carried on through the BSA Lone Cub Scout and Lone Boy Scout programs.

US Criteria
Boys/Girls  (in the USA) who are eligible to become Lone Scouts include:

Children of American citizens who live abroad
Exchange students away from the United States for a year or more
Boys/girls with disabilities that might prevent them from attending regular meetings of packs or troops
Boys/Girls  in rural communities who live far from a Scouting unit
Sons/Daughters of migrant farmworkers
Boys/Girls  who attend night schools or boarding schools
Boys/Girls  who have jobs that conflict with troop meetings
Boys/Girls  whose families travel frequently, such as circus families, families who live on boats, missionaries, etc.
Boys/Girls  who alternate living arrangements with parents who live in different communities
Boys/Girls  who are unable to attend unit meetings because of life-threatening communicable diseases
Boys/Girls  whose parents believe their child might be endangered by getting to Scout unit meetings
Boys/Girls  who are being home schooled and whose parents do not want them spending time with other children in a youth group.

See also

Lone Guides
Lone Scouts of America

References

Peterson, Robert (October 2001). Scouting Alone. Scouting Magazine.
Lone Scouts of South Australia

Scouting